Xiamen International Center is a skyscraper under construction in Xiamen, China. The tower was topped out in April 2016, but remains unfinished.

The China Post & Telecommunication Tower, a planned 342-meter tall office building was previously planned to be at the same location. The project began construction in 1996 but was halted at podium level. The current building began construction in 2014, and was sold unfinished in a liquidation sale by the previous owner on November 11, 2020.

From 2016 to present, Xiamen International Center has been the tallest building in the city of Xiamen, as well as tallest in the Haixi Metropolitan Area.

The Xiamen International Center, when completed, will serve as a hotel and an office after completion in 2025.

References

Skyscrapers in Xiamen
Buildings and structures under construction in China
Skyscraper office buildings in China